On February 13, 1991, three members of the Red Army Faction (RAF) fired about 250 rounds using a military rifle at the United States embassy in Bonn, Germany.

The suspects fired at the embassy from a distance of about 500 metres from Villa Von-Weiß-Straße 8, located across the Rhine river in Königswinter. The incident was linked to the ongoing Gulf War. In a note left at the scene, the RAF said the attack was done to combat American imperialism and to get it out of Iraq. The attackers escaped their positions in a stolen Volkswagen Passat car and were never caught. The embassy received some bullet holes and broken windows, but no major damage was caused.

The same G1 rifle was used by the RAF in the killing of Detlev Karsten Rohwedder afterwards.

In October 2001, new DNA tests of a hair left in the passenger seat of the Passat revealed that Daniela Klette may have been one of the suspects. Klette is an RAF member who was already suspected in other attacks, such as the prison bombing in Weiterstadt in 1993. Klette remains at large and nobody else has ever been convicted for the attack.

See also
Downing Street mortar attack

References

1991 in Germany
February 1991 events in Europe
Attacks on diplomatic missions of the United States
Terrorist incidents in Germany in 1991
Red Army Faction
Germany–United States relations